Mozarteum University Salzburg (German: Universität Mozarteum Salzburg) is one of three affiliated but separate (it is actually a state university) entities under the “Mozarteum” moniker in Salzburg municipality; the International Mozarteum Foundation and the Mozarteum Orchestra Salzburg are the other two. It specializes in music, the dramatic arts, and to a lesser degree graphic arts. Like its affiliates it was established in honour of Salzburg-born musician Wolfgang Amadeus Mozart.

History and clarification
In 1841, Mozart's widow Constanze Weber Mozart founded the first of the “Mozarteum” entities: the “Cathedral Music Association and Mozarteum,” whose mission was the “refinement of musical taste with regard to sacred music and concerts.” The association operated as predecessor to the Mozarteum Orchestra Salzburg through the 19th century and was at the heart of the city’s musical life, offering concerts and related activities. It assumed its present name in 1998. 

The International Mozarteum Foundation came next, toward the end of the 19th century. It built, and to this day maintains, a sizeable elegant office building on Schwarzstraße to which are attached two concert halls. Construction took place between 1910 and 1914 to a design by Munich architect Richard Berndl (1875–1955). The larger of the two halls is itself known as the “Mozarteum” and is world-renowned; its proper name is simply "Großer Saal." The smaller hall is the "Wiener Saal." Besides maintaining this complex, the foundation runs two museums devoted to Mozart (the composer’s birth house, or "Geburtshaus," and his main Salzburg residence, or "Wohnhaus") as well as an annual January music festival devoted to Mozart's music ("Mozartwoche"). 

The more recently rebuilt University main building is at Mirabellplatz 1.

Organ of the Großer Saal
The original 100-rank grand concert hall organ was built by the Austrian firm Rieger in 1914. A completely new organ in neo-Baroque style was installed in 1970 by E. F. Walcker & Cie. This was dismantled in 2008. In 2010 a new 50-stop tracker action organ was installed by Hermann Eule Orgelbau, Bautzen, and the 1914 façade for the instrument was reconstructed.

Organ of the Wiener Saal
The pipe organ in the "Wiener Saal" small concert hall, invisibly located in an organ chamber above the stage, was built in 1914 by Rieger with 25 stops and electro-pneumatic action. It was rebuilt in 1941, including a new console and some neobaroque modifications. The organ is in bad condition, but still playable.

Notable alumni

 Barbara Bonney (soprano)
 Marios Joannou Elia (composer and artistic director)
 David Frühwirth (violinist)
 Ingrid Haebler (pianist) 
 Leopold Hager (conductor) 
 Angelika Kirchschlager (mezzo soprano)
 Herbert von Karajan (conductor)
 Christiane Karg (soprano)
 Genia Kühmeier (soprano)
 Marjon Lambriks (soprano)
 Giorgi Latso (pianist)
 Erich Leinsdorf (conductor)
 Igor Levit (pianist)
 Kerstin Meyer (mezzo-soprano) 
 Nils Mönkemeyer (violist)
 Pier Giorgio Morandi (conductor)
 Alexander Mullenbach (composer and pianist)
 Camilla Nylund (soprano)
 Karola Obermueller (composer)
 Carl Orff (composer)
 Wolfgang Rennert (opera conductor)
 Alice Sara Ott (pianist)
 Frank Philipp Schlößmann (born 1963), scenic and costume designer
 Rosl Schwaiger (1918–1970), coloratura soprano
 Sarah Traubel (soprano)
 Norma Wendelburg (1918–2016), composer, pianist and academic teacher
 Herbert Willi (born 1956), composer
 Tabea Zimmermann (violist)

Notable teachers

 Barbara Bonney (voice)
 Reinhard Febel (composition)
 Eliot Fisk (guitar)
 Vittorio Ghielmi (viola da gamba)
 Michael Gielen (conducting)
 Pavel Gililov (piano)
 Reinhard Goebel (barock violin, conducting)
 Veronika Hagen-Di Ronza (viola)
 Leopold Hager (conducting)
 Sheila Jones Harms (voice)
 Nikolaus Harnoncourt (conducting)
 Adriana Hölszky (composition)
 Wolfgang Holzmair (lied and oratorio)
 Johannes Kalitzke (conducting of contemporary music)
 Karl-Heinz Kämmerling (piano)
 Angelika Kirchschlager (voice)
 Wilma Lipp (voice)
 Tristan Murail (composition)
 Felix Petyrek (composition)
 Ildikó Raimondi (voice)
 Ruggiero Ricci (violin)
 Gerhard Röthler (harpsichord)
 Jacques Rouvier (piano)
 Heinrich Schiff (cello)
 Otmar Suitner (conducting) 
 Laurence Traiger (composition)
 Bruno Weil (conducting)
 Gerhard Wimberger (conducting, composition)
 Duo Tal & Groethuysen (piano)

References

External links
  
 Mozarteum Precollege Program (German)
  The Mozarteum – Salzburg Guide
 Mozarteum Orchestra of Salzburg
  International Mozarteum Foundation website
 Institute for historical and modern-day Mozart Opera Interpretation

 
Music schools in Austria
Concert halls in Austria
Universities and colleges in Austria
Educational institutions established in 1841
Buildings and structures in Salzburg
1841 establishments in the Austrian Empire